The Pocket-knife or  Het Zakmes  is a 1992 Dutch children's film directed by Ben Sombogaart. It is based on Sjoerd Kuyper's novel Het Zakmes. The film won several awards, including a Golden Calf Best Director Award.

Plot
The story is about a 6-year-old boy who tries to return his friend's penknife, but faces difficulties because his friend has moved to another town. He has to keep his quest a secret because he is forbidden to carry a knife. Eventually he enters a talent contest, hoping to get a message to his friend through a song.

Cast
Olivier Tuinier	... 	Mees Grobben
Verno Romney	... 	Tim
Adelheid Roosen	... 	Mees' moeder
Genio De Groot     ... 	Mees' vader
Beppie Melissen	... 	Strenge juf
Maxim Hartman	... 	Bert Boot
Samantha Angenent	... 	Majorette
Priscilla Blanken	... 	Majorette
Roel Dekker	... 	Postbode
Esther Gast	... 	Floormanager
Sietze Greydanis	... 	Jongen met viool
Karin van Holst Pellekaan	... 	Baliedame
Jaap Hoogstra	... 	Oudere heer
Kees Hulst	        ... 	Meneer Hollenberg
Heleen Hummelen	... 	Lokettiste
Frits Jansma       ... 	Drukker
Ellen Röhrman	... 	Reizigster
Sarah Sijlbing	... 	Cynthia
Sebastiaan Spaan	... 	Eduard
Maria Tap	        ... 	Haastige mevrouw
Wil van der Meer	... 	Muziekwinkelier
Almara van Gijn	... 	Majorette
Kirsten Wilkeshuis	... 	Meisje met gitaar

References

External links 
 

Films set in the Netherlands
Netherlands in fiction
Films based on children's books
1992 films
1990s Dutch-language films
Dutch children's films